Marcel Tschopp  (born 28 April 1974 in Ruggell) is a Liechtensteiner orienteer and track athlete, specializing in the marathon. Tschopp was Liechtenstein's flag bearer for the opening ceremony of the 2008 Summer Olympics in Beijing, and finished 74th in the men's marathon.

He is a physician by profession.

Achievements

Athletics

Orienteering

References

External links
 
 

1974 births
Living people
Liechtenstein male long-distance runners
Liechtenstein male marathon runners
Athletes (track and field) at the 2008 Summer Olympics
Athletes (track and field) at the 2012 Summer Olympics
Olympic athletes of Liechtenstein
World Athletics Championships athletes for Liechtenstein
Liechtenstein orienteers
Male orienteers
Foot orienteers